The A Division, also known as the IRT Division, is a division of the New York City Subway, consisting of the lines operated with services designated by numbers (1, 2, 3, 4, 5, 6, 7) and the 42nd Street Shuttle. These lines and services were operated by the Interborough Rapid Transit Company before the 1940 city takeover.

List of lines
The following lines are part of the A Division (services shown in parentheses; lines with colors next to them are trunk lines):

 IRT 42nd Street Shuttle
 IRT Broadway–Seventh Avenue Line
IRT Dyre Avenue Line
IRT Eastern Parkway Line
 IRT Flushing Line
IRT Jerome Avenue Line
IRT Lenox Avenue Line
 IRT Lexington Avenue Line
IRT New Lots Line
IRT Nostrand Avenue Line
IRT Pelham Line
IRT White Plains Road Line

Service history
Numbers were assigned to subway services in 1948:

The 42nd Street Shuttle and Bowling Green–South Ferry Shuttle also provided subway services, and elevated service remained on the Third Avenue Line and Polo Grounds Shuttle.

See also 
 B Division (New York City Subway)
 Interborough Rapid Transit Company
 New York City Subway

References

New York City Subway
Interborough Rapid Transit Company